Adam Piłsudski (Zalavas, 25 September 1869 - 16 December 1935) was a member of the Senate of Poland, vice president of Wilno, brother of the famous Józef Piłsudski. He was honored with the Officer's Cross of the Order of Polonia Restituta.

1869 births
1935 deaths
People from Švenčionys District Municipality
People from Sventsyansky Uyezd
Nonpartisan Bloc for Cooperation with the Government politicians
Senators of the Second Polish Republic (1935–1938)
Officers of the Order of Polonia Restituta
Burials at Rasos Cemetery
Adam